Family for Every Child is a global alliance of local civil society organisations working together to improve the lives of vulnerable children around the world.

The alliance has offices in New Zealand (Auckland), United Kingdom (London) and USA (Arlington, VA).

History 
EveryChild was a charity, based in the United Kingdom, which dealt with children's rights, in particular the protection and aid for children growing up without parental care or family.

In 2014, EveryChild worked with many of its former local partners and other grassroots organisations to create Family for Every Child; a global alliance of 27 local organisations working together to help vulnerable children and families.

EveryChild and Family for Every Child became one organisation on 1 October 2016.

References

External links 
 Family for Every Child website
 EveryChild website

Children's charities based in the United Kingdom
Development charities based in the United Kingdom
International charities